Yohan Delattre (born 24 January 1968) is a French handball player. He competed in the men's tournament at the 1996 Summer Olympics.

References

1968 births
Living people
French male handball players
Olympic handball players of France
Handball players at the 1996 Summer Olympics
Sportspeople from Lille